Peter Jung may refer to:

Peter Jung, character in 10 Years (2011 film)
Peter Jung (footballer), see 1985 FIFA U-16 World Championship squads
Peter Jung (politician), see List of German Christian Democratic Union politicians